Agraphydrus is a genus of water scavenger beetle in the family Hydrophilidae represented by 205 described species. It is distributed across the Afrotropical, Australasian, and Indomalayan realms.

Taxonomy 
The genus Agraphydrus was described for the first time by Régimbart in 1903.

It currently contains 205 described species, partly thanks to a series revisionary work developed by Albretch Komarek.

Description 
Small beetles (1.4–4.8 mm), pale/yellowish to dark brown in coloration, eyes not emarginate, labrum exposed, maxillary palps moderately long. Elytra without sutural striae, not laterally explanate; the elytral punctation ranges from very fine and subtle to coarse.

A complete diagnosis was presented by Girón and Short, but also see Komarek and collaborators.

Habitat 
According to Girón and Short, based on annotations by Komarek and collaborators:

Agraphydrus can be found in an extremely broad range of habitats, from rivers, streams and forest pools, to hygropetric environments around waterfalls or seepages over rocks; a few species have been collected in terrestrial habitats by sifting moss and leaves from near water bodies, or in the gravel along the bank of a river; in many cases specimens have been found associated with floating vegetation, mosses and algae.

Species

References 

Hydrophilidae